Nicola Ascoli (born 11 September 1979) is an Italian football coach and a former player who played as a defender. He is the head coach of Imperia. He spent most of his career playing in Serie B and Serie C.

Coaching career
In 2012, Ascoli became the director of sport at Serie D side Asti and joined the coaching staff under Enrico Pasquali after obtaining his coaching license.

On 14 October 2021, he was appointed head coach of Imperia in Serie D.

Personal life
Ascoli is married to Alessandra Sinopoli, sister-in-law of Juventus and Italy midfielder Claudio Marchisio, his teammate for a season at Empoli. The couple have a daughter.

References

External links

1979 births
People from Vibo Valentia
Living people
Italian footballers
Association football defenders
Empoli F.C. players
U.S. Catanzaro 1929 players
Frosinone Calcio players
FC Universitatea Cluj players
Serie A players
Liga I players
Italian expatriate footballers
Expatriate footballers in Romania
Italian expatriate sportspeople in Romania
Italian football managers
Serie D managers
Sportspeople from the Province of Vibo Valentia
Footballers from Calabria